Takis Mehmet Ali (born 17 June 1991) is a German politician and Member of the Bundestag for the Social Democratic Party of Germany.

Political career 
In the 2021 German federal election, he contested Lörrach – Müllheim but lost to Diana Stöcker from the Christian Democratic Union. He was number 22 on the state list and was entitled to sit in the Bundestag.

Personal life 
Mehmet Ali's parents immigrated to Germany from Greece and Turkey in the 1980s. He is single and resides in Badenweiler. He is a Greek Orthodox Christian. He came out as gay in 2021.

References 

Living people
1991 births
German people of Greek descent
German politicians of Turkish descent
21st-century German politicians
Members of the Bundestag for Baden-Württemberg
Members of the Bundestag for the Social Democratic Party of Germany
Members of the Church of Greece
People from Breisgau-Hochschwarzwald
Members of the Bundestag 2021–2025
Gay politicians
German LGBT politicians
LGBT members of the Bundestag